al-Imara, was a Palestinian village, located in the northern Negev Desert  northwest of Beersheba.

History
In the British mandate period the village was classified  as a hamlet by the Palestine Index Gazetteer.

Post-1948 
During the 1948 Arab-Israeli War, the village was captured by the Yiftach Brigade in early October, meeting with no resistance.

The Palestinian historian Walid Khalidi,  described the village remains in 1992: 
"The village site has been completely built over by the kibbutz of Urim. Although the kibbutz was established in 1946 near the village of Al-Imara, during the  1948 Arab-Israeli War, it was moved to the site of the former British police station. About 2 km southeast of the current kibbutz there are remains of several stone structures. These were the houses that belonged to Bedouin families before 1948 and were not considered part of al-Imara.

See also
Depopulated Palestinian locations in Israel

References

Bibliography

External links
Welcome to al-Imara at Palestine Remembered
al-'Imara,  Zochrot

Arab villages depopulated during the 1948 Arab–Israeli War
District of Beersheba